Rineloricaria nigricauda is a species of catfish in the family Loricariidae. It is native to South America, where it occurs in coastal streams in the state of Rio de Janeiro in Brazil. The species reaches 6.5 cm (2.6 inches) in standard length and is believed to be a facultative air-breather.

References 

Loricariini
Fish described in 1904
Catfish of South America
Freshwater fish of Brazil
Taxa named by Charles Tate Regan